Arati Prabhakar (born February 2, 1959) is an American engineer serving as the 12th director of the White House Office of Science and Technology Policy (OSTP) and Science Advisor to the President since October 3, 2022. She was the former head of DARPA, the United States Defense Advanced Research Projects Agency, a position she held from July 30, 2012 to January 20, 2017. She is a founder and the CEO of Actuate, a nonprofit organization.

She headed the National Institute of Standards and Technology (NIST) from 1993 to 1997, and was the first woman to head NIST.

Early life and education
Prabhakar's family immigrated to the United States from New Delhi, India when she was three; her mother was seeking an advanced degree in social work in Chicago. Prabhakar grew up in Lubbock, Texas, from age ten. Her mother encouraged her to pursue a PhD from a very early age.

She has a 1979 bachelor of science in electrical engineering from Texas Tech University in Lubbock, Texas. She earned a Master of Science in electrical engineering in 1980 and a PhD in applied physics in 1984, both from the California Institute of Technology. She was the first woman to earn a PhD in applied physics from Caltech.

Career

After receiving her PhD, she went to Washington, D.C. on a 1984 to 1986 congressional fellowship with the Office of Technology Assessment. Prabhakar subsequently worked at DARPA from 1986 to 1993, initially as a program manager but later as founding director of DARPA's Microelectronics Technology Office.

At the age of 34, Prabhakar was appointed as head of the National Institute of Standards and Technology (NIST), a position she held from 1993 to 1997. After NIST, she was the Chief Technology Officer and senior vice president of Raychem from 1997 to 1998. She was then the vice president and later president of Interval Research from 1998 to 2000.

She joined U.S. Venture Partners from 2001 to 2011, focusing on investment in green technology and information technology startups. On July 30, 2012, she became the head of DARPA, replacing Regina E. Dugan.

Prabhakar was a Fellow at the Center for Advanced Study in the Behavioral Sciences (CASBS) at Stanford 2017–18. In 2019, she started Actuate, a nonprofit organization to open innovation for society's challenges.

Awards and memberships
Prabhakar is a member of the Institute of Electrical and Electronics Engineers and was named IEEE Fellow in 1997 for "leadership in partnering between industry and government to promote economic growth through the development of manufacturing technologies for semiconductor devices". She is a member of the National Academy of Engineering. She has also been named a Texas Tech Distinguished Engineer and a Distinguished Alumna of California Institute of Technology.

She is a member of the governing board for the Pew Research Center and a member of the U.S. National Academies' Science Technology and Economic Policy Board. She was a member of the board of directors of SRI International in 2012, and was also a member of the U.S. National Academies' Science Technology and Economic Policy Board and the College of Engineering Advisory Board at the University of California, Berkeley.

Prabhakar is featured in the Notable Women in Computing cards.

References

External links

1959 births
Living people
20th-century American engineers
20th-century American women
20th-century women engineers
21st-century American women
21st-century women engineers
American electrical engineers
American women engineers
Asian-American members of the Cabinet of the United States
Biden administration cabinet members
California Institute of Technology alumni
DARPA directors
Directors of the Office of Science and Technology Policy
Directors of SRI International
Engineers from Texas
Fellow Members of the IEEE
Indian emigrants to the United States
NIST Directors
People from Lubbock, Texas
People from New Delhi
Texas Tech University alumni
Women members of the Cabinet of the United States